Durham University Hockey Club is a field hockey club that is based at Durham University. The club's home ground is at the Maiden Castle Sports Centre in Durham.

Structure
The club runs five men's teams, with the first XI playing (as of the 2021/22 season) in the Men's England Hockey League Premier Division, and five women's teams, with the first XI playing (as of the 2021/22 season) in the Women's England Hockey League Division One North.

Coaches
, the club is coached by Gareth Weaver-Tyler and Claire Dobison-Lee. Durham graduate and Scottish international Jamie Cachia was previously part of the coaching staff.

Gavin Featherstone, a Durham alumnus and former England international who had coached the United States at the 1984 Olympics and South Africa at the 1996 Olympics, led the Durham coaching team from 2003. His period in charge saw an improvement in club fortunes, with the men participating in the National Hockey League for the first time. He eventually joined Cornell University in 2012.

Notable players

Men's internationals

Women's internationals

References

English field hockey clubs
Sport in Durham, England
Sport in County Durham
Hockey